Doreen Denny (born 28 January 1941) is a British retired ice dancer. With partner Courtney Jones, she is the 1959 & 1960 World champion and 1959-1961 European champion.

After the 1961 season, Denny and Jones announced their retirement from competitive skating, as  Denny planned to marry Italian dance champion Gianfranco Canepa and move to the Continent.

Following her retirement from competitive skating, she became a coach. She coached at the Broadmoor Skating Club and among her students were Colleen O'Connor & Jim Millns, whom she coached to an Olympic medal.

In 1982, Denny's 1959 World Champion tray was stolen during a burglary at her home. It was returned to her in 2010.

Results
(with Courtney Jones)

References

 

British female ice dancers
1941 births
Living people
British figure skating coaches
World Figure Skating Championships medalists
European Figure Skating Championships medalists
Female sports coaches